John Coolidge Adams (born February 15, 1947) is an American composer and conductor whose music is rooted in minimalism. Among the most regularly performed composers of contemporary classical music, he is particularly noted for his operas, which are often centered around recent historical events. Apart from opera, his oeuvre includes orchestral, concertante, vocal, choral, chamber, electroacoustic and piano music.

Born in Worcester, Massachusetts, Adams grew up in a musical family, being regularly exposed to classical music, jazz, musical theatre and rock music. He attended Harvard University, studying with Kirchner, Sessions and Del Tredici among others. Though his earliest work was aligned with modernist music, he began to disagree with its tenets upon reading John Cage's Silence: Lectures and Writings. Teaching at the San Francisco Conservatory of Music, Adams developed his own minimalist aesthetic, which was first fully realized in Phrygian Gates (1977) and later in the string septet Shaker Loops. Increasingly active in the contemporary music scene of San Francisco, his large-scale orchestral works Harmonium and Harmonielehre (1985) first gained him national attention. Other popular works from this time include the fanfare Short Ride in a Fast Machine (1986) and the orchestral work El Dorado (1991).

Adams's first opera was Nixon in China (1987), which recounts Richard Nixon's 1972 visit to China and was the first of many collaborations with theatre director Peter Sellars. Though the work's reception was initially mixed, it has become increasingly favored since its premiere, receiving performances worldwide. Begun soon after Nixon in China, the opera The Death of Klinghoffer (1991) was based on the Palestinian Liberation Front's 1985 hijacking and murder of Leon Klinghoffer and incited considerable controversy over its content and choice of subject matter. His next notable works include a Chamber Symphony (1992), a Violin Concerto (1993), the opera-oratorio El Niño (2000), the orchestral piece My Father Knew Charles Ives (2003) and the six-string electric violin concerto The Dharma at Big Sur. Adams won a Pulitzer Prize for Music for On the Transmigration of Souls (2002), a piece for orchestra and chorus commemorating the victims of the September 11, 2001, attacks. Continuing with historical subjects, Adams wrote the opera Doctor Atomic (2005), based on J. Robert Oppenheimer, the Manhattan Project, and the building of the first atomic bomb. Later operas include A Flowering Tree (2006) and Girls of the Golden West (2017).

In many ways Adams's music is developed from the minimalist tradition of Steve Reich and Philip Glass; however, he tends to more readily engage in the immense orchestral textures and climaxes of late Romanticism in the vein of Wagner and Mahler. His style is to a considerable extent a reaction against the modernist serialism promoted by the Second Viennese and Darmstadt School. In addition to the Pulitzer, Adams has received the Erasmus Prize, a Grawemeyer Award, five Grammy Awards, the Harvard Arts Medal, France's Ordre des Arts et des Lettres, and six honorary doctorates.

Life and career

Youth and early career
John Adams, in full John Coolidge Adams, was born in Worcester, Massachusetts, on February 15, 1947. As an adolescent, he lived in Woodstock, Vermont for five years before moving to East Concord, New Hampshire, and his family spent summers on the shores of Lake Winnipesaukee, where his grandfather ran a dance hall. Adams' family didn't own a television, and didn't have a record player until he was ten. However, both his parents were musicians; his mother was a singer with big bands, and his father was a clarinetist. He grew up with jazz, Americana, and Broadway musicals, once meeting Duke Ellington at his grandfather's dance hall. Adams also played baseball as a boy.

In the third grade, Adams took up the clarinet, initially taking lessons from his father, Carl Adams, and later with Boston Symphony Orchestra bass clarinetist Felix Viscuglia. He also played in various local orchestras, concert bands, and marching bands while a student. Adams began composing at the age of ten and first heard his music performed as a teenager. He graduated from Concord High School in 1965.

Adams next enrolled in Harvard University, where he earned a Bachelor of Arts in 1969 and a Master of Arts in 1971, studying composition under Leon Kirchner, Roger Sessions, Earl Kim, Harold Shapero and David Del Tredici. As an undergraduate, he conducted Harvard's student ensemble, the Bach Society Orchestra, for a year and a half; his ambitious programming drew criticism in the student newspaper, where one of his concerts was called "the major disappointment of last week's musical offerings." Adams also became engrossed by the strict modernism of the 20th century (such as that of Boulez) while at Harvard, and believed that music had to continue progressing, to the extent that he once wrote a letter to Leonard Bernstein criticizing the supposed stylistic reactionism of Chichester Psalms. By night, however, Adams enjoyed listening to The Beatles, Jimi Hendrix, and Bob Dylan, and has relayed he once stood in line at eight in the morning to purchase a copy of Sgt. Pepper's Lonely Hearts Club Band.

Adams was the first student at Harvard to be allowed to write a musical composition for his senior thesis. For his thesis, he wrote The Electric Wake for "electric" (i.e. amplified) soprano accompanied by an ensemble of "electric" strings, keyboards, harp, and percussion. However, a performance could not be put together at the time, and Adams has never heard the piece performed. Adams received his B.A. magna cum laude and completed his M.A., also at Harvard, in 1971.

After graduating, Adams received a copy of John Cage's book Silence: Lectures and Writings from his mother. Largely shaken of his loyalty to modernism, he was inspired to move to San Francisco, where he taught at the San Francisco Conservatory of Music from 1972 until 1982, teaching classes and directing the school's New Music Ensemble. In the early 1970s, Adams wrote several pieces of electronic music for a homemade modular synthesizer he called the "Studebaker". He also wrote American Standard, composed of three movements, a march, a hymn, and a jazz ballad, which was recorded and released on Obscure Records in 1975.

1977 to Nixon in China

In 1977, Adams wrote the half-hour-long solo piano piece Phrygian Gates, which he later called "my first mature composition, my official 'opus one'", as well as its much shorter companion piece, China Gates. The next year, he finished Shaker Loops, a string septet based on an earlier, unsuccessful string quartet called Wavemaker. In 1979, he finished his first orchestral work, Common Tones in Simple Time, which was premiered by the San Francisco Conservatory of Music Orchestra under Adams' baton.

In 1979, Adams became the New Music Adviser for the San Francisco Symphony and created the symphony's New and Unusual Music concerts. A commission from the symphony resulted in Adams' large, three-movement choral symphony Harmonium (1980–81) setting texts by John Donne and Emily Dickinson. He followed this up with the three-movement, orchestral piece (without strings), Grand Pianola Music (1982). That summer, he wrote the score for Matter of Heart, a documentary about psychoanalyst Carl Jung, a score he later derided as being "of stunning mediocrity". In the winter of 1982–83, Adams worked on the purely-electronic score for Available Light, a dance choreographed by Lucinda Childs with sets by architect Frank Gehry. Without dance, the electronic piece alone is called Light Over Water.

After an eighteen-month period of writer's block, Adams wrote his three-movement, orchestral piece Harmonielehre (1984–85), which he described as "a statement of belief in the power of tonality at a time when I was uncertain about its future." As with many of Adams' pieces, it was inspired by a dream, in this case, a dream in which he was driving across the San Francisco–Oakland Bay Bridge and saw an oil tanker on the surface of the water abruptly turn upright and take off like a Saturn V rocket.

From 1985 to 1987, Adams composed his first opera, Nixon in China, with libretto by Alice Goodman, based on Richard Nixon's 1972 visit to China. The opera marked the first collaboration between Adams and theatre director Peter Sellars, who had proposed it to Adams in 1983. Adams has subsequently worked with Sellars on all of his operas.

During this time, Adams also wrote The Chairman Dances (1985), which he described as an "'out-take' of Act III of Nixon in China", to fulfill a long-delayed commission for the Milwaukee Symphony. He also wrote the short orchestral fanfare Short Ride in a Fast Machine (1986).

1988 to Doctor Atomic
Adams wrote two orchestral pieces in 1988: Fearful Symmetries, a 25-minute work in the same style as Nixon in China, and The Wound-Dresser, a setting of Walt Whitman's 1865 poem of the same title, written when Whitman was volunteering at a military hospital during the American Civil War. The Wound-Dresser is scored for baritone voice, two flutes (or two piccolos), two oboes, clarinet, bass clarinet, two bassoons, two horns, trumpet (or piccolo trumpet), timpani, synthesizer, and strings.

During this time, Adams established an international career as a conductor. From 1988 to 1990, he served as conductor and music advisor for the Saint Paul Chamber Orchestra. He has also served as artistic director and conductor of the Ojai and Cabrillo Music Festivals in California. He has conducted orchestras around the world, including the New York Philharmonic, the Chicago Symphony, the Cleveland Orchestra, the Los Angeles Philharmonic, the London Symphony Orchestra, and the Royal Concertgebouw Orchestra, performing pieces by composers as diverse as Debussy, Copland, Stravinsky, Haydn, Reich, Zappa, and Wagner, as well as his own works.

He completed his second opera, The Death of Klinghoffer, in 1991, again working with librettist Alice Goodman and director Peter Sellars. The opera is based on the 1985 hijacking of the Italian cruise ship Achille Lauro by Palestinian terrorists and details the murder of passenger Leon Klinghoffer, a retired, physically disabled American Jew. The opera has generated controversy, including allegations that it is antisemitic and glorifies terrorism.

Adams' next piece, Chamber Symphony (1992), is for a 15-member chamber orchestra. Written in three movements, the work is inspired by an unlikely combination of sources: Arnold Schoenberg's Chamber Symphony No. 1, Op. 9 (which Adams was studying at the time) and the "hyperactive, insistently aggressive and acrobatic" music of the cartoons his young son was watching.

The next year, he composed his Violin Concerto for American violinist Jorja Fleezanis. Lasting a little more than half an hour, this work is also in three movements: a "long extended rhapsody for the violin" is followed by a slow chaconne (titled "Body through which the dream flows", a phrase from a poem by Robert Haas), and the piece ends with an energetic toccare. Adams received the Grawemeyer Award for Music Composition for his violin concerto.

In 1995, he completed I Was Looking at the Ceiling and Then I Saw the Sky, a stage piece with libretto by poet June Jordan and staging by Peter Sellars. Inspired by musicals, Adams referred to the piece as a "songplay in two acts". The main characters are seven young Americans from different social and ethnic backgrounds, all living in Los Angeles, with stories that take place around the 1994 Northridge earthquake.

Hallelujah Junction (1996) is a three-movement composition for two piano, which employs variations of a repeated two-note rhythm. The intervals between the notes remain the same through much of the piece. Adams used the same phrase for the title of his 2008 memoir.

Written to celebrate the millennium, El Niño (2000) is an "oratorio about birth in general and about the Nativity in specific". The piece incorporates a wide range of texts, including biblical texts as well as poems by Hispanic poets like Rosario Castellanos, Sor Juana Inés de la Cruz, Gabriela Mistral, Vicente Huidobro, and Rubén Darío,

After the September 11, 2001, terrorist attacks on the World Trade Center, the New York Philharmonic commissioned Adams to write a memorial piece for the victims of the attacks. The resulting piece, On the Transmigration of Souls, was premiered around the first anniversary of the attacks. On the Transmigration of Souls is scored for orchestra, chorus, and children's choir, accompanied by taped readings of the names of the victims mixed with the sounds of the city.  It won the 2003 Pulitzer Prize for Music as well as the 2005 Grammy Award for Best Contemporary Composition.

Commissioned by the San Francisco Symphony, Adams' orchestral piece My Father Knew Charles Ives (2003) is cast in three movements: "Concord", "The Lake", and "The Mountain". Though his father did not actually know American composer Charles Ives, Adams saw many similarities between the two men's lives and between their lives and his own, including their love of small-town New England life and their unfulfilled musical dreams.

Written for the Los Angeles Philharmonic to celebrate the opening of Disney Hall in 2003, The Dharma at Big Sur (2003) is a two-movement work for solo electric six-string violin and orchestra. Adams wrote that with Dharma, he "wanted to compose a piece that embodied the feeling of being on the West Coast – literally standing on a precipice overlooking the geographic shelf with the ocean extending far out to the horizon…" Inspired by the music of Lou Harrison, the piece calls for some instruments (harp, piano, samplers) to use just intonation, a tuning system in which intervals sound pure, rather than equal temperament, the common Western tuning system in which all intervals except the octave are impure.

Adams' third opera, Doctor Atomic (2005), is about physicist J. Robert Oppenheimer, the Manhattan Project, and the creation and testing of the first atomic bomb. The libretto of Doctor Atomic, written by Peter Sellars, draws on original source material, including personal memoirs, recorded interviews, technical manuals of nuclear physics, declassified government documents, and the poetry of the Bhagavad Gita, John Donne, Charles Baudelaire, and Muriel Rukeyser. The opera takes place in June and July 1945, mainly over the last few hours before the first atomic bomb explodes at the test site in New Mexico. Characters include Oppenheimer and his wife Kitty, Edward Teller, General Leslie Groves, and Robert Wilson. Two years later, Adams extracted music from the opera to create the three-movement Doctor Atomic Symphony.

After Doctor Atomic 
Adams' next opera, A Flowering Tree (2006) with libretto by Adams and Sellars, is based on a folktale from the Kannada language of southern India as translated by A.K. Ramanujan about a young girl who discovers that she has the magic ability to transform into a flowering tree. The two-act opera was commissioned as part of the Vienna New Crowned Hope Festival to celebrate the 250th anniversary of Mozart's birth. As such, it has many parallels with Mozart's The Magic Flute, including its themes of "magic, transformation and the dawning of moral awareness."

Adams wrote three pieces for the St. Lawrence String Quartet: his First Quartet (2008), his concerto for string quartet and orchestra, Absolute Jest (2012), and his Second Quartet (2014). Both Absolute Jest and the Second Quartet are based on fragments from Beethoven, with Absolute Jest using music from his late quartets (specifically Opus 131, Opus 135 and the Große Fuge) and the Second Quartet drawing from Beethoven's Opus 110 and 111 piano sonatas.

From 2011 to 2013, Adams wrote his two-act Passion oratorio, The Gospel According to the Other Mary, a decade after his Nativity oratorio, El Niño. The work focuses on the final few weeks of the life of Jesus from the point of view of "the other Mary", Mary of Bethany (sometimes mis-identified as Mary Magdalene), her sister Martha, and her brother, Lazarus. The libretto by Peter Sellars draws its texts from the Old Testament and New Testament of the Bible and from Rosario Castellanos, Rubén Darío, Dorothy Day, Louise Erdrich, Hildegard von Bingen, June Jordan, and Primo Levi.

Scheherazade.2 (2014) is a four-movement "dramatic symphony" for violin and orchestra. Written for violinist Leila Josefowicz who frequently performed Adams' Violin Concerto and The Dharma at Big Sur, the work was inspired by the character Scheherazade (from One Thousand and One Nights) who, after being forced into marriage, recounts tales to her husband in order to delay her death. Adams associated modern examples of suffering and injustice towards women around the world, with acts in Tahrir Square during the Egyptian revolution of 2011, Kabul, and comments from The Rush Limbaugh Show.

Adams' most recent opera, Girls of the Golden West (2017), with a libretto by Sellars based on historical sources, is set in mining camps during the California Gold Rush of the 1850s. Sellars described the opera this way: "These true stories of the Forty-Niners [a name for people who took part in the 1849 Gold Rush] are overwhelming in their heroism, passion and cruelty, telling tales of racial conflicts, colorful and humorous exploits, political strife and struggles to build anew a life and to decide what it would mean to be American."

Personal life 
Adams was married to Hawley Currens, a music teacher, from 1970 to 1974. He is married to photographer Deborah O'Grady, with whom he has a daughter, Emily, and a son, the composer Samuel Carl Adams.

Musical style

The music of Adams is usually categorized as minimalist or post-minimalist, although in an interview he said that his music is part of the 'post-style' era at the end of the twentieth century. While Adams employs minimalist techniques, such as repeating patterns, he is not a strict follower of the movement. Though Adams did adopt much of the minimalist technique of predecessors Steve Reich and Philip Glass, his writing synthesizes this with the immense orchestral textures of Wagner, Mahler and Sibelius. Comparing Shaker Loops to the minimalist composer Terry Riley's piece In C, Adams remarked:

Many of Adams's ideas in composition are a reaction to the philosophy of serialism and its depictions of "the composer as scientist". The Darmstadt School of twelve tone composition was dominant during the time that Adams was receiving his college education, and he compared class to a "mausoleum where we would sit and count tone-rows in Webern".

Adams experienced a musical epiphany after reading John Cage's book Silence (1973), which he claimed "dropped into [his] psyche like a time bomb". Cage posed fundamental questions about what music was, and regarded all types of sounds as viable sources of music. This perspective offered to Adams a liberating alternative to the rule-based techniques of serialism. Cage's own music, however, Adams found equally restricting. At this point, Adams began to experiment with electronic music, and his experiences are reflected in the writing of Phrygian Gates (1977–78), in which the constant shifting between modules in Lydian mode and Phrygian mode refers to activating electronic gates rather than architectural ones. Adams explained that working with synthesizers caused a "diatonic conversion", a reversion to the belief that tonality was a force of nature.

Some of Adams's compositions are an amalgamation of different styles. One example is Grand Pianola Music (1981–82), a humorous piece that purposely draws its content from musical cliches. In The Dharma at Big Sur, Adams draws from literary texts such as Jack Kerouac, Gary Snyder, and Henry Miller to illustrate the California landscape. Adams professes his love of other genres other than classical music; his parents were jazz musicians, and he has also listened to rock music, albeit only passively. Adams once claimed that originality wasn't an urgent concern for him the way it was necessary for the minimalists and compared his position to that of Gustav Mahler, J.S. Bach, and Johannes Brahms, who "were standing at the end of an era and were embracing all of the evolutions that occurred over the previous thirty to fifty years".

Adams, like other minimalists of his time (e.g. Philip Glass), used a steady pulse that defines and controls the music. The pulse was best known from Terry Riley's early composition In C, and slowly more and more composers used it as a common practice. Jonathan Bernard highlighted this adoption by comparing Phrygian Gates, written in 1977, and Fearful Symmetries written eleven years later in 1988.

In the late 1980s and early 1990s, Adams started to add a new character to his music, which he called "the Trickster". The Trickster allowed Adams to use the repetitive style and rhythmic drive of minimalism, yet poke fun at it at the same time. When Adams commented on his own characterization of particular minimalist music, he stated that he went joyriding on "those Great Prairies of non-event".

Critical reception

Overview
Adams won the Pulitzer Prize for Music in 2003 for his 9/11 memorial piece, On the Transmigration of Souls. Response to his output as a whole has been more divided, and Adams's works have been described as both brilliant and boring in reviews that stretch across both ends of the rating spectrum. Shaker Loops has been described as "hauntingly ethereal", while 1999's Naïve and Sentimental Music has been called "an exploration of a marvelously extended spinning melody". The New York Times called 1996's Hallelujah Junction "a two-piano work played with appealingly sharp edges", and 2001's American Berserk "a short, volatile solo piano work".

The most critically divisive pieces in Adams's collection are his historical operas. At first release, Nixon in China received mostly negative press feedback. Donal Henahan, writing in The New York Times, called the Houston Grand Opera world premiere of the work "worth a few giggles but hardly a strong candidate for the standard repertory" and "visually striking but coy and insubstantial". James Wierzbicki for the St. Louis Post-Dispatch described Adams's score as the weak point in an otherwise well-staged performance, noting the music as "inappropriately placid", "cliché-ridden in the abstract" and "[trafficked] heavily in Adams's worn-out Minimalist clichés". With time, however, the opera has come to be revered as a great and influential production. Robert Hugill for Music and Vision called the production "astonishing ... nearly twenty years after its premier", while The Guardian'''s Fiona Maddocks praised the score's "diverse and subtle palette" and Adams' "rhythmic ingenuity".

More recently, The New York Times writer Anthony Tommasini commended Adams for his work conducting the American Composers Orchestra. The concert, which took place in April 2007 at Carnegie Hall, was a celebratory performance of Adams's work on his sixtieth birthday. Tommasini called Adams a "skilled and dynamic conductor", and noted that the music "was gravely beautiful yet restless".

Klinghoffer controversy

The opera The Death of Klinghoffer has been criticized as antisemitic by some, including by the Klinghoffer family. Leon Klinghoffer's daughters, Lisa and Ilsa, after attending the opera, released a statement saying: "We are outraged at the exploitation of our parents and the coldblooded murder of our father as the centerpiece of a production that appears to us to be anti-Semitic." In response to these accusations of antisemitism, composer and Oberlin College professor Conrad Cummings wrote a letter to the editor defending Klinghoffer as "the closest analogue to the experience of Bach's audience attending his most demanding works", and noted that, as a person of Jewish descent, he "found nothing anti-Semitic about the work".

After the September 11 attacks in 2001, performances by the Boston Symphony Orchestra of excerpts from Klinghoffer were canceled. BSO managing director Mark Volpe remarked of the decision: "We originally programmed the choruses from John Adams' The Death of Klinghoffer because we believe in it as a work of art, and we still hold that conviction. ... [Tanglewood Festival Chorus members] explained that it was a purely human reason, and that it wasn't in the least bit a criticism of the work." Adams and Klinghoffer librettist Alice Goodman criticized the decision, and Adams rejected a request to substitute a performance of Harmonium, saying: "The reason that I asked them not to do Harmonium was that I felt that Klinghoffer is a serious and humane work, and it's also a work about which many people have made prejudicial judgments without even hearing it. I felt that if I said, 'OK, Klinghoffer is too hot to handle, do Harmonium, that in a sense I would be agreeing with the judgment about Klinghoffer.' " In response to an article by the San Francisco Chronicles David Wiegand denouncing the BSO decision, musicologist and critic Richard Taruskin accused the work of catering to "anti-American, anti-Semitic and anti-bourgeois" prejudices.

A 2014 revival by the Metropolitan Opera reignited debate. Former New York City mayor Rudy Giuliani, who marched in protest against the production, wrote: "This work is both a distortion of history and helped, in some ways, to foster a three decade long feckless policy of creating a moral equivalency between the Palestinian Authority, a corrupt terrorist organization, and the state of Israel, a democracy ruled by law." The Mayor serving at the time, Bill de Blasio, criticized Giuliani's participation in the protests, and Oskar Eustis, the artistic director of The Public Theater, said in support of the production: "It is not only permissible for the Met to do this piece – it's required for the Met to do the piece. It is a powerful and important opera." A week after watching a Met performance of the opera, Supreme Court Justice Ruth Bader Ginsburg said "there was nothing anti-Semitic about the opera," and characterized the portrayal of the Klinghoffers as "very strong, very brave", and the terrorists as "bullies and irrational".

List of works

Operas and stage works

 Nixon in China (1987)
 The Death of Klinghoffer (1991)
 I Was Looking at the Ceiling and Then I Saw the Sky (song play) (1995)
 El Niño (opera-oratorio) (2000)
 Doctor Atomic (2005)
 A Flowering Tree (2006)
 The Gospel According to the Other Mary (opera-oratorio) (2013)
 Girls of the Golden West (2017)
 Antony and Cleopatra (2022)

Orchestral works
 Common Tones in Simple Time (1979)
 Grand Pianola Music (1982)
 Shaker Loops (adaptation of the 1978 string septet for string orchestra) (1983)
 Harmonielehre (1985)
 The Chairman Dances (1985)
 Tromba Lontana (1986)
 Short Ride in a Fast Machine (1986)
 Fearful Symmetries (1988)
 El Dorado (1991)
 Lollapalooza (1995)
 Slonimsky's Earbox (1996)
 Naïve and Sentimental Music (1998)
 Guide to Strange Places (2001)
 My Father Knew Charles Ives (2003)
 Doctor Atomic Symphony (2007)
 City Noir (2009)
 I Still Dance (2019)

Concertante
piano
 Eros Piano (for piano and orchestra) (1989)
 Century Rolls (concerto for piano and orchestra) (1997)
 Must the Devil Have All the Good Tunes? (concerto for piano and orchestra) (2018)
violin
 Violin Concerto (1995 Grawemeyer Award for Music composition) (1993)
 The Dharma at Big Sur (concerto for solo electric violin and orchestra) (2003)
 Scheherazade.2 (dramatic symphony for violin and orchestra) (2014)
others
 Absolute Jest (for string quartet and orchestra) (2012)
 Saxophone Concerto (2013)

Vocal and choral works
 Harmonium (1980)
 The Nixon Tapes (three suites from Nixon in China) (1987)
 The Wound-Dresser (1989)
 Choruses from The Death of Klinghoffer (1991)
 On the Transmigration of Souls (2002)

Chamber music
 Piano Quintet (1970)
 Shaker Loops (for string septet) (1978)
 Chamber Symphony (1992)
 John's Book of Alleged Dances (for string quartet) (1994)
 Road Movies (for violin and piano) (1995)
 Gnarly Buttons (for clarinet and chamber ensemble) (1996)
 Son of Chamber Symphony (2007)
 Fellow Traveler (for string quartet) (2007)
 First Quartet (2008)
 Second Quartet (2014)

Other ensemble works
 American Standard, including "Christian Zeal and Activity" (1973)
 Grounding (1975)
 Scratchband (1996)
 Nancy's Fancy (2001)

Tape and electronic compositions
 Heavy Metal (1970)
 Studebaker Love Music (1976)
 Onyx (1976)
 Light Over Water (1983)
 Hoodoo Zephyr (1993)

Piano
 Phrygian Gates (1977)
 China Gates (1977)
 Hallelujah Junction (for two pianos) (1996)
 American Berserk (2001)
 Roll Over Beethoven (for two pianos) (2014)
 I Still Play (2017)

Film scores
 Matter of Heart (1982)
 The Cabinet of Dr. Ramirez (1991)
 American Tapestry (1999)
 I Am Love (Io sono l'amore) – pre-existing pieces by Adams (2010)
 Call Me by Your Name, contributions (2017)

Orchestrations and arrangements
 The Black Gondola (Liszt's La lugubre gondola II (1882)) (1989)
 Berceuse élégiaque (Busoni's Berceuse élégiaque (1907)) (1989)
 Wiegenlied (Liszt's Wiegenlied (1881)) (1989)
 Six Songs by Charles Ives (Ives songs) (1989–93)
 Le Livre de Baudelaire (Debussy's Cinq poèmes de Charles Baudelaire) (1994)
 La Mufa (Piazzolla tango) (1995)
 Todo Buenos Aires (Piazzolla tango) (1996)

Awards and recognition Major awards Pulitzer Prize for Music for On the Transmigration of Souls (2003)
Pulitzer Prize for Music Finalist for Century Rolls (1998) and The Gospel According to the Other Mary (2014)
Erasmus Prize (2019)Grammy awardsBest Contemporary Composition for Nixon in China (1989)
Best Contemporary Composition for El Dorado (1998)
Best Classical Album for On the Transmigration of Souls (2004)
Best Orchestral Performance for On the Transmigration of Souls (2004)
Best Classical Contemporary Composition for On the Transmigration of Souls (2004)Other awardsRoyal Philharmonic Society Music Award for Best Chamber Composition for Chamber Symphony (1994)
University of Louisville Grawemeyer Award for Music Composition for Violin Concerto (1995)
California Governor's Award for Lifetime Achievement in the Arts
 Cyril Magnin Award for Outstanding Achievement in the Arts
Chevalier dans l'Ordre des Arts et des Lettres (Knight of the Order of Arts and Letters) (2015)
Harvard Arts Medal (2007)
2018 BBVA Foundation Frontiers of Knowledge Award in the category of Music and OperaMembershipsFellow of the American Academy of Arts and Sciences (1997)
 Member of the American Academy of Arts and Letters (1997)Honorary DoctoratesHonorary Doctorate of Arts from University of Cambridge (2003)
Honorary Doctorate of Arts from Northwestern University (2008)
 Honorary Doctorate of Music from Duquesne University (2009)
 Honorary Doctorate of Music from Harvard University (2012)
 Honorary Doctorate of Music from Yale University (2013)
 Honorary Doctorate of Music from Royal Academy of Music (2015)OtherCreative Chair of the Los Angeles Philharmonic (2009–present)

References

Bibliography
 
 
  
 
 
 
 
 
 
 
 

Further reading
Butterworth, Neil. "John Adams", Dictionary of American Classical Composers. 2nd ed. New York and London: Routledge, 2005. 
Daines, Matthew. "The Death of Klinghoffer by John Adams", American Music vol. 16, no. 3 (Autumn 1998), pp. 356–358. [review]
Richardson, John. "John Adams: A Portrait and a Concert of American Music", American Music vol. 23, no. 1 (Spring 2005), pp. 131–133. [review]
Rimer, J. Thomas. "Nixon in China by John Adams", American Music vol. 12, no. 3 (Autumn 1994), pp. 338–341. [review]
Schwarz, K. Robert. "Process vs. Intuition in the Recent Works of Steve Reich and John Adams", American Music vol. 8, no. 3 (Autumn 1990), pp. 245–273.

External links

 
 Profile, Boosey & Hawkes
 Profile, Cdmc
 
 Programs regarding John Adams, NPR Music
 
 
 Composer's entry on IRCAM's databaseSpecific operas "Doctor Atomic: An Opera by John Adams and Peter Sellars" on doctor-atomic.com. References 2005 world premiere performances at the San Francisco Opera.
 Essay on Doctor Atomic by Thomas May. 
 "The Myth of History": Interview with Adams and Peter Sellars about Nixon in ChinaInterviews'''
 "A Vast Synthesising Approach", interview with Robert Davidson, February 27, 1999
 
 "An American Portrait: Composer John Adams", WGBH Radio, Boston

1947 births
20th-century American composers
20th-century American conductors (music)
20th-century American male musicians
20th-century classical composers
21st-century American composers
21st-century American conductors (music)
21st-century American male musicians
21st-century classical composers
Academics of the Royal Academy of Music
American autobiographers
American classical composers
American contemporary classical composers
American electronic musicians
American film score composers
American male classical composers
American male conductors (music)
American male film score composers
American opera composers
Chevaliers of the Ordre des Arts et des Lettres
Classical musicians from Massachusetts
Fellows of the American Academy of Arts and Sciences
Grammy Award winners
Harvard University alumni
Honorary Members of the Royal Academy of Music
Ivor Novello Award winners
Living people
Male opera composers
Members of the American Academy of Arts and Letters
Minimalist composers
Musicians from Worcester, Massachusetts
Nonesuch Records artists
Oratorio composers
Political music artists
Pulitzer Prize for Music winners
Pupils of Earl Kim
Pupils of Leon Kirchner
Pupils of Roger Sessions
San Francisco Conservatory of Music alumni